North Mecklenburg High School is a high school in Huntersville, North Carolina. The school mascot is the Viking, and the school colors are royal blue, red, and white. Founded in 1951, the school was integrated during the 1960s. The principal is Stephanie Hood.

History 
North Mecklenburg High School first opened its doors to students on September 4, 1951. Many of North Meck's first expansions occurred in 1957, with the addition of the H-hall to meet the needs of the growing student population. During the 1960s, North's curriculum expanded to include instruction in Art, Orchestra, Drama, Spanish, Child Care, Auto Mechanics and ROTC.

Desegregation began at North Meck during the 1965–1966 school year. By 1969, the school had been fully integrated. During the early 1970s, North Meck's student population had reached around 1100 students.

By the 2000–2001 school year, North Meck had grown into the largest high school in the state, with over 2700 students. To help alleviate with the growing student body, the school added more buildings and mobile classrooms. In the fall of 2001, Hopewell High School opened its doors to help with the needs of the growing Huntersville community.

Curriculum 
North Mecklenburg High School offers a comprehensive program including International Baccalaureate, which is the most rigorous program at North Meck, Advanced Placement, Academically Gifted, and advanced classes, fine arts programs, Air Force JROTC, and a variety of workforce development courses. The school serves as a World Language Magnet High School for Charlotte-Mecklenburg Schools. The school has one of two auto tech courses in North Carolina. Eighty-six percent of graduates attend four-year colleges, universities, or junior colleges.

Extracurricular activities

Sports
North Mecklenburg is a 4A school that is a part of the North Carolina High School Athletic Association (NCHSAA), and competes in the MecKa Conference. The conference consists of Charlotte/Mecklenburg County Schools.

Speech and Debate team
The Speech and Debate team, a member of the National Speech and Debate Association, is active in both North and South Carolina, as well as in the national circuit. The team hosts the annual "The Jimmy K Poole Viking Classic" each October. They have coached several students who went onto be ranked number 1 nationwide in their events, and several National Semi-finalists, Finalists, and Champions.

Notable alumni 
Duggar Baucom, college basketball head coach
Christopher O. Barnes, chemist and Professor at Stanford University
 Jeff Hammond, NASCAR personality and commentator
 Larry Hefner, NFL linebacker with the Green Bay Packers 1972–1975
 Melvin Hoover, former NFL wide receiver
 Robert Jackson, NFL offensive guard with the Cleveland Browns 1975–1985
 DeMarco Johnson, professional basketball player
 Bishop Eddie L. Long, served as senior pastor of New Birth Missionary Baptist Church in Lithonia, Georgia
 Alyssa Ramsey, soccer player who played for the United States women's national team
 Ryder Ryan, professional baseball pitcher in the Texas Rangers organization, member of USA 2020 Olympic baseball team
 Jamie Skeen, professional basketball player
 Andrea Stinson, three-time WNBA All-Star with the Charlotte Sting
 Tony Wike, actor, radio personality and journalist
 Scott Williams, former NFL fullback and tight end

References

External links 
 Official school website

Public high schools in North Carolina
International Baccalaureate schools in North Carolina
Schools in Mecklenburg County, North Carolina
1951 establishments in North Carolina
Educational institutions established in 1951